Jacques Vien (3 March 1932 – 8 July 2017) was a member of the House of Commons of Canada from 1988 to 1993. By career, he was a businessman and a bailiff.

Born in Verdun, Quebec), he was elected in the 1988 federal election at the Laurentides electoral district for the Progressive Conservative party. He served in the 34th Canadian Parliament after which he was defeated by Bloc Québécois candidate Monique Guay in the 1993 federal election. He also campaigned unsuccessfully to regain the seat for the Progressive Conservatives in the 1997 and 2000 federal elections.

He died on 8 July 2017 at the age of 85.

Electoral record (incomplete)

References

External links
 

1932 births
2017 deaths
French Quebecers
Members of the House of Commons of Canada from Quebec
People from Verdun, Quebec
Progressive Conservative Party of Canada MPs